Sussex County Courthouse is located at the corner of High and Spring Streets in Newton, the county seat of Sussex County, New Jersey. It is part 10th vicinage of the New Jersey Superior Court.

It was originally built in 1765 and rebuilt in 1847. It is one of the courthouses dating from the 18th century and among the oldest courthouses in the United States still in active use. It was added to the National Register of Historic Places on July 23, 1979 for its significance in architecture, using Greek Revival temple style.

History
The courthouse was the site of a daring raid during the American Revolution by one of the Loyalists' best operatives, Lieutenant James Moody.  In 1780, Moody led several men to free eight Loyalist prisoners held in the Sussex County Courthouse.  Moody freed the men and fled with them.  Despite a pursuit lasting several days, Revolutionary forces failed to capture them.  The court was gutted by fire in 1847 and rebuilt within the original fieldstone walls.

The old courthouse continues to handle judicial proceedings in conjunction with a newer Sussex County Judicial Center built in 1992.

See also
County courthouses in New Jersey
Richard J. Hughes Justice Complex
National Register of Historic Places listings in Sussex County, New Jersey
List of the oldest courthouses in the United States

References

External links
 

Buildings and structures in Sussex County, New Jersey
County courthouses in New Jersey
Government buildings completed in 1761
Greek Revival architecture in New Jersey
Courthouses on the National Register of Historic Places in New Jersey
National Register of Historic Places in Sussex County, New Jersey
Newton, New Jersey
New Jersey Register of Historic Places